Guglielmo Letteri (11 January 1926 in Rome – 2 February 2006 in Rome) was an Italian comic book artist, best known for his work on the Tex Willer comic.

References 
Lambiek Comiclopedia page about Guglielmo Letteri

1926 births
2006 deaths
Italian comics artists